The Aussie Bird Count is a project of BirdLife Australia. It is a citizen science project in which volunteers conduct bird counts around Australia.

In the 2017 bird count, almost two million birds were counted.

In 2022, the project was renamed to the Aussie Bird Count to reflect the ability to count in any outdoor space.

See also
Australian Bird Count
BioBlitz ("24-hour inventory")
Breeding Bird Survey
Christmas Bird Count (CBC) (in the Western Hemisphere)
Systematic Census of Australian Plants
Tucson Bird Count (TBC) (in Arizona in the US)

References

Bird censuses
 
Ornithological equipment and methods
Ornithology in Australia